The Signalhorn is a mountain of the Silvretta Alps, located on the border between Switzerland and Austria. It lies just east of the Silvretta Pass and is the tripoint between the regions of Prättigau and Engadin (in the Swiss canton of Graubünden) and Montafon (in the Austrian state of Vorarlberg).

References

External links
Signalhorn on Hikr

Mountains of the Alps
Alpine three-thousanders
Mountains of Vorarlberg
Mountains of Graubünden
Austria–Switzerland border
International mountains of Europe
Mountains of Switzerland